USS Colorado (SSN-788) is a nuclear powered United States Navy  attack submarine, named for the State of Colorado. She was constructed by Huntington Ingalls Industries in partnership with the Electric Boat division of General Dynamics in Newport News, Virginia, with the initial contract awarded on 22 December 2008.

The official naming ceremony was on 25 June 2012. Her keel was laid down on 7 March 2015 and she was christened and launched on 3 December 2016. Her sponsor is Annie Mabus, daughter of former Navy Secretary Ray Mabus

References

 

Virginia-class submarines
Nuclear submarines of the United States Navy
Ships built in Groton, Connecticut